The King Abdullah Financial District (KAFD) is a mixed-use financial district located near King Fahad Road in the Al Aqeeq area of Riyadh, Saudi Arabia Managed by the King Abdullah Financial District Development and Management Company (KAFD DMC), a wholly-owned subsidiary of the Kingdom's Public Investment Fund, the district was previously being managed by the Rayadah Investment Corporation on behalf of the Pension Authority of the Kingdom of Saudi Arabia. The district is the largest LEED certified financial centre in the world.

Structure
The project consists of more than 83 buildings, including 61 towers, and combines residential solutions, work and entertainment over a space of more than 1.6 million square meters. It will provide more than 3 million square meters of space for various uses, 62,000 parking spaces and accommodation for 12,000 residents. In 2011, it was the largest project in the world seeking green building accreditation. Bombardier won a $241m contract to build an automated monorail for the development. The design guidelines do not separate the genders in the district. The KAFD master plan was designed and overseen by Danish architectural firm Henning Larsen Architects. International architecture firms such as HOK, Omrania, SOM, CallisonRTKL, Gensler, and Foster + Partners were commissioned to design individual buildings in the district, such as the 380-meter PIF Tower (HOK and Omrania). Additional design work was provided by W Architecture and Landscape Architecture. The CEO of the company, KAFD DMC, is Gautam Sashittal. The project was at one point estimated to cost 29 billion Saudi riyals ($7.8 billion).  

Upon completion, KAFD is expected to host round 50,000 residents. As Riyadh is characterized by its high temperature, a solar system will be installed to cool the passenger bridges that are going to act as a network that connects 30 building together.     

The project is considered to be long overdue and needed for a city of the size and position of Riyadh. The key issue with the project was timing as it was announced and incepted during the 2008 financial crisis. A number of local and international commentators highlighted the potential oversupply issue with the project. However, others, such as Hans Mueller in Saudi Real Estate Companion, believe that the market will be able to absorb the supply in the medium term.

The first phase was expected to open by July 2017.

Transport
The district will be served by the King Abdullah Financial District (KAFD) Metro Station on the under-construction Riyadh Metro.  The station covers an area of 45,000 m2 and is located at the east of the Northern Ring Road. It will connect to metro lines 1, 4, 6, and the KAFD monorail. The station is designed by Zaha Hadid Architects from the UK and is one of four major stations on the metro network.

In addition all buildings will be linked by an air-conditioned skywalk system enabling pedestrian access across the entire development.

See also
 List of things named after Saudi Kings

References

Year of establishment missing
Buildings and structures in Riyadh
Geography of Riyadh
Economy of Riyadh
Finance in Saudi Arabia
Proposed infrastructure in Saudi Arabia
Financial districts